University of Massachusetts Global (UMass Global), formerly Brandman University, is a private university with 25 campuses throughout California and Washington and a virtual campus. The university offers more than 90 degree, certificate, credential and professional programs for working adults. Brandman was a separate, regionally-accredited university within the Chapman University system. In September 2021, Brandman separated from the Chapman University system, and formed a new affiliation with the University of Massachusetts, UMass Global. UMass Global is accredited by the WASC Senior College and University Commission.

History

Chapman University 
The institutional history of UMass Global history began in 1958, when faculty from then-Chapman College first delivered on-base classes at Marine Corps Air Station El Toro in Orange County, California. After expanding education services to additional military facilities, Chapman formed a Division of Residence Education Centers to manage its operations. The centers evolved into the College of Lifelong Learning, which  became Chapman University College in 2001. Chapman University College was incorporated in 2008. In 2009, the university was renamed Brandman University after a substantial donation from the Joyce and Saul Brandman Foundation.

University of Massachusetts 
In September 2021, Brandman affiliated with the University of Massachusetts (UMass) via a change of control agreement and rebranded as UMass Global. The development followed UMass' announcement two years prior that it would launch an online affiliate. The arrangement calls for Chapman to receive $96 million from UMass Global, with disbursements to be made over a 10-year term. UMass Global has also agreed to buy its Irvine, California, campus for $37 million. There will be leadership and oversight overlap between the UMass Board of Regents and that of UMass Global.

UMass Global still has a presence on military bases, with campuses at Naval Base Kitsap, Naval Air Station Lemoore, Joint Base Lewis–McChord, Travis Air Force Base, and Naval Air Station Whidbey Island. While the Brandman name was still in use, Military Times ranked the university as one of the nation’s “Best for Vets” for 2021.

As of September 2021, UMass Global had 23,000 students online and in person, with the majority being on the West Coast.

Academics
The university offers degree programs through five schools: The Marybelle and S. Paul Musco School of Nursing and Health Professions; School of Education; School of Business and Professional Studies; School of Arts and Sciences; and School of Extended Education.

UMass Global uses a curriculum model known as iDEAL (Instructional Design for Engaged Adult Learning). and all of its faculty positions are non-tenured.

The university is accredited by the WASC Senior College and University Commission and is a member of the Council for Adult and Experiential Learning (CAEL). Additionally, the School of Nursing and Health Professions follows the American Association of Colleges of Nursing (AACN) standards. Teacher training programs offered through the School of Education are accredited by the California Commission on Teacher Credentialing (CCTC) and the National Council for Accreditation of Teacher Education (NCATE). The undergraduate social work program is accredited by Council on Social Work Education (CSWE).

References

External links
 Official website

Chapman University
Private universities and colleges in California
Private universities and colleges in Washington (state)
Distance education institutions based in the United States
Organizations based in Irvine, California
Universities and colleges in Orange County, California
American companies established in 1958
Educational institutions established in 1958
1958 establishments in California
Schools accredited by the Western Association of Schools and Colleges